Diatraea venosalis is a moth in the family Crambidae. It was described by Harrison Gray Dyar Jr. in 1917. It is found in the US states of Louisiana and Oklahoma.

The wingspan is about 18 mm. Adults have been recorded on wing in May and June.

References

Chiloini
Moths described in 1917